Joshua Kosman (born October 27, 1959) is an American music critic who specializes in classical music. The chief classical music critic of the San Francisco Chronicle since 1988, Kosman has a particular interest in contemporary classical music, championing composers such as John Adams and Aaron Jay Kernis. Described by the music critic Jayson Greene as having a "congenial, probing tone that blends a reporter’s instincts with a critic’s acumen," he has written for a variety of other publications.

Life and career
Joshua Kosman was born in Boston, Massachusetts on October 27, 1959. He attended Yale College, receiving a Bachelor of Arts, and the University of California, Berkeley for a Master of Arts.

Since 1988, Kosman has been a music critic of the San Francisco Chronicle. He was hand-picked in 1993 by the music critic Robert Commanday to succeed him as chief classical music critic for the Chronicle. He frequently writes on contemporary classical music, promoting composers such as John Adams, Aaron Jay Kernis, Michael Gordon, Chen Yi, and Lisa Bielawa. Other topics Kosman engages with include "orchestral management" and the pianist David Helfgott, who came into the spotlight after the movie 1996 Shine. The music critic Jayson Greene described Kosman as having a "congenial, probing tone that blends a reporter’s instincts with a critic’s acumen." 

His writing credits span numerous other publications, including Bookforum, Gramophone, The Journal of Musicology, Opernwelt, Piano & Keyboard, Symphony, as well as The New Grove Dictionary of Music and Musicians and New Grove Dictionary of Opera. Kosman won awards from the Society of Professional Journalists, the San Francisco Peninsula Press Club, and ASCAP, who gave him the 2006 Deems Taylor Award for music criticism. He is a former vice president of the Music Critics Association of North America. He maintains a classical music blog, On a Pacific Aisle.

Outside of music, Kosman makes weekly cryptic crosswords for The Nation.

References

External links
  – Classical music blog
 
 Articles by Kosman on the San Francisco Chronicle
 

1959 births
Living people
American music critics
Classical music critics
People from Boston
San Francisco Chronicle people
Yale College alumni
University of California, Berkeley alumni